= 1911 Tasmanian local elections =

Local elections in Tasmania, Australia

| ← 1910 | 27 April 1911 | 1912 → |

All 53 local government areas in Tasmania

The 1911 Tasmanian local elections were held on 27 April 1911 to elect the councils of all 53 local government areas (LGAs) in Tasmania. Around a third of councillors across the state were up for election.
